Shirdley Hill was a railway station in the village of Shirdley Hill, Lancashire, on the Liverpool, Southport and Preston Junction Railway. Situated on Renacres Lane, the station opened on 1 November 1887 and was the only station on the Barton Branch to have a level crossing instead of a road bridge. The "Altcar Bob" service operated through Shirdley Hill from July 1906.

The station closed to passengers on 26 September 1938, though the line remained open for goods traffic until 21 January 1952.

Nothing remains of the station, with the site now occupied by a road named Shaws Garth, just off Renacres Lane. The road is named in memory of the last stationmaster, Thomas Shaw, and a plaque marks the location of the station. The plaque reads: "Site of Shirdley Hill Railway Station on the Southport-Downholland Branch Line. Closed to passengers 1938 and to goods traffic 1952. Stationmaster Thomas Shaw."

References

Further reading

External links 
 Shirdley Hill at Disused Stations
 The line and mileages via Railwaycodes

Disused railway stations in the Borough of West Lancashire
Former Lancashire and Yorkshire Railway stations
Railway stations in Great Britain opened in 1887
Railway stations in Great Britain closed in 1938
Halsall